Homeinns Co., Ltd, doing business as Home Inns Group or Home Inns & Hotels Management Inc. (Nasdaq: HMIN), is a hotel chain in China. It is a part of BTH Hotels and its headquarters are in the Xuhui District, Shanghai. Its English slogan is "your home away from home."

Home Inn is the largest budget hotel chain in China, and it was the first budget chain that was established in China.

History
Ji Qi founded the chain in 2001, and it began in 2002. Private equity funded the hotel chain. In October 2006 it was listed on Nasdaq in the United States. IDG Ventures invested in the company, causing it to raise $109 million U.S. dollars in its 2006 Nasdaq listing.

In 2007 Home Inn considered building hotels in Taiwan. In October 2007 Home Inn purchased Top Star, a hotel company that had been established two years prior. The transaction netted Home Inn an additional 26 hotels. As of 2008 the company had around 250 hotels, and Home Inn, Motel 168 and Jinjiang Inn together controlled 44% of China's budget hotel market. At that time the company planned to increase the number to 1,000 and to open outlet in other Asian countries. The chain acquired Motel 168 in October 2011.

In December 2015 BTG Hotels (of the Beijing Tourism Group) announce will acquire Home Inn chain for 11 billion renminbi (1.7 billion U.S. dollars).

In April 2016, Home Inn completed the Going Private Transaction and sold to BTG Hotels.

Operations
Brands include Home Inn, Motel 168, Yitel, and Fairyland Hotel.

Yitel is a business-oriented brand of Home Inn.

See also

References

Further reading
 Securities and Exchange Commission (United States):
 "Exhibit 99.1 Homeinns Enters into Definitive Merger Agreement"
 "AGREEMENT AND PLAN OF MERGER among BTG Hotels Group (HONGKONG) Holdings Co., Limited, BTG Hotels Group (CAYMAN) Holding Co., Ltd, Homeinns Hotel Groupand, solely for the purposes of Section 6.02(e), Section 6.08, Section 6.09, Section 8.06, Section 9.09 and Section 9.10, BTG Hotels (Group) Co., Ltd. Dated as of December 6, 2015"

External links

 Homeinns Co., Ltd/BTH Hotels  

Hospitality companies of China
Companies based in Shanghai
Hotels established in 2002
Hotel chains in China
Companies formerly listed on the Nasdaq
Chinese brands
Chinese companies established in 2002
Hospitality companies established in 2002